Wonderful! Liang Xi Mei is a 2018 Chinese New Year Singaporean comedy film directed by Jack Neo. It stars Neo, alongside Mark Lee, Henry Thia, Benjamin Tan, Wang Lei, Jaspers Lai, Chua Lee Lian, and Cavin Soh. The film was released on 15 February 2018 in Singapore and Malaysia.

Plot
Liang Xi Mei (Jack Neo) is finally back! Now retired, Liang Xi Mei spends her time looking after her obedient grandchildren. However, Robert (Mark Lee), her eldest son adds to her woes as he is always dreaming of making a fortune through easy means. She pins all her hopes on her youngest son, Albert (Benjamin Tan). Her favouritism stirs up jealousy within Robert, who vows to strike it rich to win Liang Xi Mei’s approval. By chance, Robert picks up the doll that is actually the Goddess of Fortune! She helps Robert but also appeals to him to be more down to earth and practical in his pursuit of success and wealth. Instead, he turns into an ingrate as soon as his hawker business takes off. His arrogance incurs the wrath of the God of Misfortune who decides to teach him a lesson. Soon, trouble ensues among Liang Xi Mei’s family and their best friends Guang Dong Po (Wang Lei) and Lion King (Henry Thia). Will they get through this headache of a situation together as a family?

Cast
Jack Neo as Liang Xi Mei/Liang Po Po
Mark Lee as Robert
Henry Thia as Lion King/Ah Gong
Benjamin Tan as Albert
Wang Lei as Guang Dong Po/Wang Lei
Jaspers Lai as Merlion King
Chua Lee Lian as Mary
Cavin Soh as Kway Teow King
Cai Ping Kai as Goddess of Fortune
Gadrick Chin as God of Misfortune 
Toh Xin Hui as Ah Girl
Zhang Wei as Uncle Lee
Ryan Lian as Kidnapper 
Noah Yap as Kidnapper
Richie Koh as Big Boss

Cameo
Yeo Yann Yann as Mrs Fu
Aileen Tan as Mrs Lu
Irene Ang as Mrs Shou
Apple Chan as Young Liang Xi Mei
Leon Lim as Young Uncle Lee

Reception

Critical reception
Yip Wai Yee of The Straits Times gave the film a 1 out of 5 stars, as "showing up only at the beginning of the film and then again briefly at the end, she feels like a complete afterthought, with her name slapped onto the movie title only for marketing purposes." Instead, it mainly focuses on "Ximei's son Robert and his obsession to get rich".

Samfrey Tan of The New Paper rated it a 1/5, citing "distasteful Hokkien puns and clownish slapstick abound, broken only by the occasional cheap sexual reference".

Box office
On February 22, 2018, one week after its release, the film crossed the RM$3 million mark in the Malaysian box office.

References

External links
 

2018 films
2010s English-language films
Hokkien-language films
2010s Mandarin-language films
Singaporean comedy-drama films
Films directed by Jack Neo
Films shot in Singapore
Films set in Singapore
Chinese New Year films
2018 comedy-drama films
2018 multilingual films
Singaporean multilingual films